Archips capsigeranus is a species of moth of the family Tortricidae. It is found in China (Heilongjiang, Shaanxi, Jiangxi, Sichuan), Korea, Japan and Russia (Pimorye, Ussuri, Askold).

The moth is 20–22 mm for males and 21–26 mm for females. There are two generations per year with adults on wing in June and September in China.

The larvae feed on Abies firma, Abies nephrolepis, Acer, Machilus thunbergii, Pieris polita, Prunus and Persea americana.

References

Moths described in 1901
Archips
Moths of Asia